You're Fired is a 1919 American silent film.

You're Fired may also refer to:
 "You're fired", a catchphrase from The Apprentice television franchise
 "You're Fired", a 1999 episode of CatDog
 "You're Fired", a 2005 episode of Second Time Around (TV series)
 "You're Fired", a 2011 episode of Mobbed
 "You're Fired", a 2012 episode of MyMusic
 "You're Fired", a 2013 episode of Teen Titans Go!

See also
 "You Are Fired (Take This Job, Ah, Fuck It)", a song from Anti-Flag's 2009 album, The People or the Gun
 Dismissal (employment)
 

English phrases